Tinni may refer to:

 Srabosti Dutta Tinni (active 2004-2013), Bangladeshi actress and model
Ousseini Tinni (born 1954), Nigerien politician

See also

Tonni (name)